This is a list of different Alzheimer's disease organizations in different countries around the world.

International
Alzheimer's Disease International 
Alzheimer Research Forum

Europe

United Kingdom
Alzheimer's Research UK
Alzheimer's Society 
Dementia Research Centre, UCL Institut of Neurology

North America

Canada
Alzheimer Society of Canada 
Alzheimer Society of Ontario

United States
Alzheimer's Association Research, education, advocacy, support 
BrightFocus Foundation
Cure Alzheimer's Fund - utilizing a venture philanthropy approach
National Institute on Aging 
Fisher Center for Alzheimer's Research Foundation
Memory Bridge

 List
Lists of organizations